Yu Xu (March 1986 – November 12, 2016) was a Chinese female fighter pilot who served as a flight squadron leader in the August 1st aerobatic team of the People's Liberation Army Air Force.

Early life 
Yu was born in Chengdu, the capital of the southwestern Chinese province Sichuan.

Education 
Yu entered the military as a student at the PLA Air Force Aviation University in 2005, and graduated in 2009. Sixteen women (including Yu) had graduated that year, which made her among the first women certified to fly fighter jets.

Career 
Yu joined the People's Liberation Army Air Force in September 2005. Yu appeared with the other female pilots at the 2010 CCTV New Year's Gala. In 2012, she was certified to fly the Chengdu J-10, single-engine jet. Yu's fans referred to her with the nickname, "Golden Peafowl."

Death 
Yu died during an aerobatic training session on November 12, 2016 after being struck by another plane as she ejected from the J-10. However, some official press reported she was unable to eject on time from her plane before it made impact with the ground.

References

1986 births
2016 deaths
People's Liberation Army Air Force personnel
Aviators killed in aviation accidents or incidents in China
People from Chengdu
Chinese women aviators
Chinese aviators
PLA Air Force Aviation University alumni
Victims of aviation accidents or incidents in 2016